The Order of Kim Il-sung is the highest order of North Korea, along with the Order of Kim Jong-il, and only second to one honorary title, the Hero of Labour.

The order, named after the country's first leader Kim Il-sung, was instituted in 1972 during a reform of the North Korean honors system. Its history is not fully known, but the order was initially round, being changed to a five-pointed star design later, and the picture of Kim Il-sung updated in 2012.

Recipients can be individuals or organizations, who have contributed to the cause of communism. It is traditionally awarded on 15 April, the Day of the Sun, the birthday of Kim Il-sung. Relatively few are awarded, totaling at least 600, to highlight the high symbolic status of the order. Recipients include Kim Jong-il, who received it four times. He was supposed to be the recipient of the first award in 1972, but according to North Korean sources, he initially refused.

History

The North Korean system of orders and medals saw periods of expansion and stagnation through the 1950s and 1960s, but in the early 1970s, major additions were made. Of these, the most important one was the addition of the Order of Kim Il-sung to the list of titles. The order was instituted on 20 March 1972 on the occasion of the 60th birthday of Kim Il-sung. At about the same time, North Korea also started awarding watches with Kim Il-sung's autograph on them. According to North Korean sources, the idea for the Order of Kim Il-sung originated with Kim Jong-il. Likewise, it is claimed that Kim Jong-il was to be the first recipient of the order, but he declined it and received the honor only in 1979.

In 2012, all orders bearing the picture of Kim Il-sung, including the Order of Kim Il-sung, were redesigned with a newer picture of Kim. At some point before that, the order had become a five-pointed star, being formerly round. It is possible that all old versions were recalled and changed to the new one.

The Order of Kim Il-sung is similar in appearance to the Soviet Order of Lenin.

Eligibility
The order is traditionally awarded annually on 15 April, the birthday of Kim Il-sung. It is awarded for "outstanding services to the Republic of the Korean nation and communism".

Out of all North Korean orders, it is awarded the most sparingly, reflecting its high symbolic status. At least 600 have been awarded.

Precedence
The order is the highest of the order of North Korea, along with the Order of Kim Jong-il, although out of titles the Hero of Labour is considered higher. The Order of the National Flag is one rank lower.

There are related prizes called the Kim Il-sung Prize, as well as prizes for youth and children.

Recipients

 Pyongyang Electric Locomotive Factory (1972)
 Kim Gwang-jin (twice: December 1978 and April 1985)
 Kim Jong-il (four times: 3 April 1979, 7 April 1982, 7 April 1992, and 29 March 2012)
 Paek In-jun (May 1980)
 Kim Jung-rin (1982)
Kim Il-chol (4 February 1982)
 Kang Seok-ju (twice: April 1982 and April 1992)
 Kim Ki-nam (twice: April 1982 and April 1992)
 Kim Tu-nam (twice: April 1982 and April 1992)
 O Kuk-ryol (twice: April 1982 and April 1992)
 Choe Yong-rim (April 1982)
 Jo Myong-rok (April 1982)
 Jon Pyong-ho (April 1982)
 Jong Chang-ryol (April 1982)
 Kang Sok-ju (April 1992)
Kim Kyung-ok (April 1992)
Lee Joo-hyon (April 1992)
 Kim Sung-ae (April 1982)
 O Jin-u (April 1982)
 Paek Hak-rim (April 1982)
 Kim Bok-shin (1982)
Mang Dong-sop (February 1990)
 Pak Nam-gi (twice: April 1985 and April 1992)
 Ri Tu-ik (April 1982)
 Kim Chung-il (twice: April 1987 and April 1992)
Kim Hak-in (April 1992)
Kim Hyung-guk (April 1992)
 Jang Sung-taek (April 1992)
 Kang Hyeon-su (April 1992)
 Choe Song-su (October 1995)
 Korean Central News Agency (three times: unknown dates and 5 December 1996)
Chang Chong-ho (October 2000)
Lee Hak-soo (April 2002)
Park In-ryong (April 2002)
Ryu Ryong-gu (April 2002)
Park Yong-go (April 2003)
Ryo Won-gu (April 2007)
 Kim Man-sik (2010)
 Han Duk-su (three times)
 Chollima Steel Complex
 Jin Pong-jun
 Kim Rak-hui
 Kim Yong-sun
 
 Paek Jong-muk
 Pyongyang Kim Jong-suk Textile Mill
 Ri Jong-ok
 Ro Ik-hwa (sculptor)
 Ryu Mi-yong
 Yon Hyong-muk 
 Kim Il-sung University
Pyongyang University of Music and Dance (1989)
 Kigwancha Sports Club
Ri Yong-suk
Kim Yong Ju
Kang Ki-sop

See also

List of things named after Kim Il-sung
Orders and medals of North Korea

References

Works cited

Further reading

 

 
Orders, decorations, and medals of North Korea
Kim Il-sung